The  was the main stream of the Yodo River before 1907, when the current (new) Yodo River was constructed by a normalisation project. Now called the Kyū-Yodo River, it is a major waterway in central Osaka and the main drainage of Neyagawa river.

The name Kyū-Yodo river means former Yodo river in Japanese.

Subdivisions

The name Kyū-Yodo River is a geological name, locally it is called by subdivision names. From the source to the mouth, it is named as follows:

Ōkawa (river)
This is the name for the section from the Kema Lock to the Tenjimbashi (bridge); the Japanese name is Ōkawa (大川).

Dōjima River

This is the name for the section from the Tenjimbashi (bridge) to the Funatsubashi (bridge) along the north shore of Nakanoshima Island; the Japanese name is Dōjima-gawa (堂島川).

Tosabori River
This is the name for the section from the Tenjimbashi (bridge) to the Funatsubashi (bridge) along the south shore of Nakanoshima Island; the Japanese name is Tosabori-gawa (土佐堀川).

Ajigawa (river)
This is the name for the section from the Funatsubashi (bridge) to Tempōzan, Osaka Bay; the Japanese name is Aji-gawa (安治川).

Points of interest
Points of interest from the source to the mouth.

Kita ward, Miyakojima ward
Yodo River
Kema Lock
Kema Sakuranomiya Park
OAP Tower
Imperial Hotel Osaka
National Mint Factory

Kita ward, Chūō ward
Keihan City Mall (department store)
Minami-Temma Park
Nakanoshima
Nakanoshima Park
Osaka Stock Exchange
Museum of Oriental Ceramics
City Hall
High District Court Osaka branch
Bank of Japan Osaka branch

Fukushima ward, Kita ward, Nishi ward
Hotarumachi
National Museum of Art, Osaka
Osaka Science Museum
Rihga Royal Hotel
Osaka International Convention Center
Osaka Central Wholesale Market

Konohana ward, Minato ward
Universal Studios Japan
Osaka Aquarium Kaiyukan
Tempōzan

Access
For Nakanoshima area, each station of Keihan Nakanoshima Line is nearest. For Osaka Aquarium Kaiyukan and Tempōzan, Metro Ōsakakō Station is nearest.

Rivers of Osaka Prefecture
Geography of Osaka
Rivers of Japan